In music, Op. 36 stands for Opus number 36. Compositions that are assigned this number include:

 Ashton – Enigma Variations
 Beethoven – Symphony No. 2
 Brahms – String Sextet No. 2
 Britten – String Quartet No. 2
 Chopin – Impromptu No. 2
 Clementi – 6 Sonatinas
 Elgar – Enigma Variations
 Górecki – Symphony No. 3
 Grieg – Cello Sonata
 Hindemith – Kammermusik
 Klebe – Alkmene
 Korngold – Die stumme Serenade
 Mendelssohn – St. Paul
 Moszkowski – Étincelles
 Myaskovsky – Symphony No. 13
 Rachmaninoff – Piano Sonata No. 2
 Rimsky – Russian Easter Festival Overture
 Schumann – 6 Gedichte
 Tchaikovsky – Symphony No. 4
 Vieuxtemps – Viola Sonata No. 1
 Waterhouse – Celtic Voices and Hale Bopp